George of the Jungle and the Search for the Secret (George of the Jungle in PAL regions) is a platform video game based on the animated television program George of the Jungle.

Gameplay
The game is in 3D but plays like a 2D side-scrolling platform game with 3D turns and camera angles in the environment and the path that George walks on. There are a total of 6 levels; 2 with a jungle theme, 2 with a swamp theme, and 2 with temple theme. All 6 levels are made to look like the cartoon series (the 2007 remake, not the original 1960s version). The secret alluded to in the game's title is never explained.

Reception

The game received "generally unfavorable reviews" on all platforms according to the review aggregation website Metacritic. IGN criticized the Wii and Nintendo DS versions for its poor collision detection and how it mocks the player with doors that lead into the background where the player can't do anything.

References

External links
 
 

2008 video games
Cartoon Network video games
George of the Jungle
Nintendo DS games
Platform games
PlayStation 2 games
Video games based on animated television series
Video games developed in the United States
Wii games
UTV Ignition Games games
Crave Entertainment games
Single-player video games
Papaya Studio games
7 Studios games